Sarawut Kambua is a retired professional footballer from Thailand. He played for Krung Thai Bank FC in the 2008 AFC Champions League group stages.

Asian Champions League Appearances

References

Living people
Sarawut Kambua
1972 births
Association football goalkeepers
Sarawut Kambua
Footballers at the 1994 Asian Games
Footballers at the 1998 Asian Games
Sarawut Kambua
Sarawut Kambua